Anania occidentalis is a moth in the family Crambidae. It was described by Eugene G. Munroe and Akira Mutuura in 1969. It is found in Yunnan, China.

References 

Moths described in 1969
Pyraustinae
Moths of Asia